Rowing at the 1998 Asian Games was held in Map Prachan Reservoir, Chonburi Province, Thailand from December 16 to 19, 1998.

Medalists

Men

Women

Medal table

Participating nations
A total of 156 athletes from 15 nations competed in rowing at the 1998 Asian Games:

References

Results

External links
Asian Rowing Federation

 
1998 Asian Games events
1998
Asian Games
Asian Games